Watson is an unincorporated community in Seneca County, in the U.S. state of Ohio.

History
A former variant name was Watsons Station. A post office called Watsons Station was established in 1854, the name was changed to Watson in 1882, and the post office closed in 1923. Besides the post office, Watson had a railroad station, a general store, and grain elevator.

References

Unincorporated communities in Seneca County, Ohio
Unincorporated communities in Ohio